Javon Ramon Searles (born 21 December 1986) played seven matches for West Indies at Under 19 level, including four matches in the 2006 U-19 Cricket World Cup in Sri Lanka. He has played in one List A match for Barbados in 2006–07, in which he scored nought and did not bowl. In January 2018, he was bought by the Kolkata Knight Riders in the 2018 IPL auction. In October 2019, he was selected to play for Barbados in the 2019–20 Regional Super50 tournament.

References

External links

1986 births
Barbadian cricketers
Barbados cricketers
Living people
Trinbago Knight Riders cricketers
Kolkata Knight Riders cricketers